Tadeusz Werno (4 August 1931 – 20 December 2022) was a Polish Roman Catholic prelate.

Werno was born in Poland and was ordained to the priesthood in 1956. He served as the titular bishop of Zattara and as the auxiliary bishop of the Roman Catholic Diocese of Koszalin-Kolobrzeg from 1974 until his retirement in 2007.

References

1931 births
2022 deaths
20th-century Roman Catholic bishops in Poland
21st-century Roman Catholic bishops in Poland
Polish Roman Catholic titular bishops
Bishops appointed by Pope Paul VI
People from Szamotuły County